Roman Petrovich Smirnov (born 2 September 1984) is a Russian sprinter who specializes in the 200 metres. His personal best time is 20.57 seconds, achieved in June 2008 in Chania. He also has 10.38 seconds in the 100 metres, achieved in June 2008 in Zhukovsky; and 6.74 seconds in the 60 metres, achieved in December 2005 in Omsk.

He was born in Leningrad. He won the silver medal at the 2003 European Junior Championships, and competed at the 2002 World Junior Championships, the 2006 European Championships and the 2008 Olympic Games without reaching the final round.

International competitions

References

External links

1984 births
Living people
Russian male sprinters
Olympic male sprinters
Olympic athletes of Russia
Athletes (track and field) at the 2008 Summer Olympics
Universiade gold medalists in athletics (track and field)
Universiade gold medalists for Russia
Universiade silver medalists for Russia
World Athletics Championships athletes for Russia
Russian Athletics Championships winners
Athletes from Saint Petersburg
21st-century Russian people